Methyl p-toluate is the organic compound with the formula CH3C6H4CO2CH3.  It is a waxy white solid that is soluble in common organic solvents.  It is the methyl ester of p-toluic acid. Methyl p-toluate per se is not particularly important but is an intermediate in some routes to dimethyl terephthalate, a commodity chemical.

References

Methyl esters
Benzoate esters
Commodity chemicals